The 1959 Alabama Crimson Tide football team (variously "Alabama", "UA" or "Bama") represented the University of Alabama in the 1959 NCAA University Division football season. It was the Crimson Tide's 65th overall and 26th season as a member of the Southeastern Conference (SEC). The team was led by head coach Bear Bryant, in his second year, and played their home games at Denny Stadium in Tuscaloosa, Legion Field in Birmingham and at Ladd Stadium in Mobile, Alabama. They finished with a record of seven wins, two losses and two ties (7–2–2 overall, 4–1–2 in the SEC) and with a loss against Penn State in the inaugural Liberty Bowl.

The Crimson Tide opened the 1959 season with three consecutive games on the road. After they dropped the opener at Georgia, they rebounded with a victory at Houston and then played Vanderbilt to a 7–7 tie at Dudley Field. Alabama then defeated  in the first Denny Stadium game of the season and tied Tennessee 7–7 at Legion Field. On homecoming, the Crimson Tide defeated Mississippi State and then one week later defeated Tulane at Ladd Stadium. The win over Tulane was both the 100th Southeastern Conference victory in the history of the Alabama program and the 100th all-time victory for Bryant as a head coach.

Alabama then went on to upset Georgia Tech and as a result entered the polls the following week for the first time since the 1954 season. The Crimson Tide then closed the regular season with a wins over Memphis State and Auburn that snapped what was then a school record five-game Iron Bowl losing streak. Alabama next accepted an invitation to compete in the inaugural Liberty Bowl where they were upset by Penn State in the final game of the season.

Schedule

Game summaries

Georgia

Sources:

To open the 1959 season, Fran Tarkenton led the Georgia Bulldogs to a 17–3 victory over the Crimson Tide at Athens. The Bulldogs took an early 3–0 lead after Durward Pennington connected on a 35-yard field goal in the first quarter. Georgia then extended their lead further to 10–0 at halftime on a 40-yard Bill Godfrey touchdown run in the second quarter. After Alabama responded with their only points in the third on a 23-yard Fred Sington, Jr. field goal, Tarkenton scored on a one-yard touchdown run in the fourth quarter that made the final score 17–3. The 17 points scored were the most allowed by a Bryant led defense to that point, and the Georgia win marked their first in an opening game since their 1954 season. The loss brought Alabama's all-time record against Georgia to 23–18–4.

Houston

Source:

A week after they opened the season with a loss at Georgia, the Crimson Tide shutout the Houston Cougars 3–0 in the first all-time meeting between the schools. On a rainy evening, the only points scored came in the third quarter on a 25-yard Fred Sington, Jr. field goal. In the game, the Crimson Tide defense had three interceptions, but was also penalized eight times for 99-yards in the victory.

Vanderbilt

Sources:

For the third time in as many seasons, the Crimson Tide played the Vanderbilt Commodores to a tie, this time by a 7–7 margin in Nashville. After a scoreless first quarter, the Commodores took a 7–0 halftime lead after Tom Moore scored on a short touchdown run in the second quarter. Alabama tied the game early in the fourth quarter on a short Pat Trammell touchdown run, Russell Morris missed a 37-yard field goal attempt later in the quarter and the game ended tied 7–7. The tie brought Alabama's all-time record against Vanderbilt to 18–16–4.

Chattanooga

Sources:

In rainy conditions for the first home game of the 1959 season, the Crimson Tide shutout the Chattanooga Mocs 13–0 in Tuscaloosa. Alabama took a 7–0 first quarter lead when Robert Skelton scored on an 18-yard touchdown run. Pat Trammell then scored the second touchdown of the game in the third on a 54-yard run that made the score 13–0. For the game, Trammell rushed for 106 yards on 17 carries to lead the Crimson Tide. The victory improved Alabama's all-time record against Chattanooga to 8–0.

Tennessee

Sources:

In their annual rivalry game against Tennessee, Alabama played the No. 14 Volunteers to a 7–7 tie in Birmingham. Tennessee took an early 7–0 lead in the first quarter. Bill Majors scored on a two-yard touchdown run that capped a nine-play, 45-yard drive. The Crimson Tide responded in the second quarter when Pat Trammell threw a 21-yard touchdown pass to Stanley Bell that tied the score 7–7. The only other scoring opportunity came late in the fourth quarter, and after Frank Sington, Jr. missed an eight-yard field goal for Alabama, the game ended in a 7–7 tie. The tie brought Alabama's all-time record against Tennessee to 18–18–6.

Mississippi State

Sources:

On homecoming in Tuscaloosa, Alabama shutout the Mississippi State Maroons 10–0 and secured their first conference victory of the 1959 season. After a scoreless first quarter, Alabama took a 3–0 halftime lead after Fred Sington, Jr. connected on a 25-yard field goal. They then extended their lead to 10–0 in the third quarter when Bobby Skelton threw a 36-yard touchdown pass to Stanley Bell. The Crimson Tide defense was dominant in the victory as they had four interceptions for the game. The victory improved Alabama's all-time record against Mississippi State to 31–10–3.

Tulane

Sources:

In their annual home game at Ladd Stadium in Mobile, the Crimson Tide overcame five turnovers and defeated the Tulane Green Wave 19–7. After a scoreless first quarter, Alabama took a 7–0 lead after Marlin Dyess scored on a four-yard touchdown run. The Greenies responded later in the quarter with a 10-yard Phil Nugent touchdown pass to Pete Abadie that tied the game 7–7 at halftime. The Crimson Tide then scored a pair of second half touchdowns. The first came in the third quarter on a 22-yard Bobby Skelton pass to Tommy Brooker and the second in the fourth quarter on a 10-yard W. E. Richardson run. The win was both the 100th Southeastern Conference victory in the history of the Alabama program and the 100th victory for Bryant as a head coach. The victory improved Alabama's all-time record against Tulane to 18–10–2.

Georgia Tech

Sources: 

Behind a 43-yard game-winning Fred Sington, Jr. field goal, the Crimson Tide upset the Georgia Tech Yellow Jackets 9–7 at Legion Field. Tech took an early 7–0 after Gary O'Steen fumbled the opening kickoff that gave the Yellow Jackets possession at the Alabama 27-yard line. Six plays later  Marvin Tibbetts scored on a two-yard run. Alabama's only touchdown drive was set up on their next possession after Tech fumbled a punt that was recovered by W. E. Richardson at their 49-yard line. Eight plays later, Marlin Dyess scored on a 10-yard run, but Bryant then elected to go for a two-point conversion that was unsuccessful and the Jackets led 7–6. What proved to be the game-winning field goal came on a 43-yard Sington kick in the second quarter that made the score 9–7. The victory improved Alabama's all-time record against Georgia Tech to 20–18–3.

Memphis State

Sources: 

After their upset victory over Georgia Tech, the Crimson Tide entered the polls for the first time since the 1954 season in the No. 17 position. Down 7–0 at halftime to underdog Memphis State, the Crimson Tide rallied with a pair of second half touchdowns and defeated the Tigers 14–7 at Denny Stadium. After a scoreless first quarter, Memphis took a 7–0 lead after Jimmy Wright scored on a one-yard touchdown run that capped an 84-yard drive. Alabama then took an 8–7 lead in the third quarter when W. E. Richardson scored on a fourth-and-three touchdown run followed it with a successful two-point conversion. Mal Moore then threw a four-yard touchdown pass to William Rice in the fourth quarter that made the final score 14–7. The victory improved Alabama's all-time record against Memphis State to 2–0.

Auburn

Sources:

As they entered their season finale against No. 11 Auburn, the Crimson Tide dropped two spots to the No. 19 position after their closer than expected game against Memphis State. At Legion Field in the annual Iron Bowl game, Alabama shutout the Tigers 10–0 and won their first game against their rival since the 1953 season. After a scoreless first quarter, Alabama took a 3–0 halftime lead on a 27-yard Tommy Brooker field goal. They extended their lead further to 10–0 in the third quarter on a 39-yard Bobby Skelton touchdown pass to Marlin Dyess. The victory improved Alabama's all-time record against Auburn to 10–13–1.

Penn State

Sources:

After their victory over Auburn in their season finale, Bryant turned down an invitation to play in the Bluegrass Bowl. However, two days later they accepted an invitation to compete in the inaugural Liberty Bowl against the Penn State Nittany Lions in the first all-time meeting between the schools. As they entered their contest against Penn State, Alabama finished the season with the No. 10 ranking and the Nittany Lions with the No. 12 ranking. At Municipal Stadium, Alabama was upset 7–0 by Penn State with the only touchdown scored in the second quarter on a 17-yard touchdown reception by Roger Kochman from Galen Hall on a fake field goal attempt. This bowl game marked the beginning of a school record 25 consecutive bowl appearances.

Personnel

Varsity letter winners

Coaching staff

References
General

 

Specific

Alabama
Alabama Crimson Tide football seasons
Alabama Crimson Tide football